FitzRoy John Somerset, 5th Baron Raglan (8 November 1927 – 24 January 2010) was a British peer, the son of FitzRoy Richard Somerset, 4th Baron Raglan and the Hon. Julia Hamilton. He married Alice Baily, daughter of Peter Baily, in 1973. He and Alice were divorced in 1981. They had no children.

Charity work
Raglan was the president of the equality charity Parity.

He was the Patron of the Bugatti Owners' Club, owners and operators of the renowned Prescott Speed Hill Climb, near Cheltenham, Gloucestershire.

Death and will 
The 5th Baron died in the early hours of 24 January 2010 at Nevill Hall Hospital in Abergavenny, Monmouthshire aged 82.

The title passed to his younger brother, Geoffrey, 6th Baron Raglan, but he willed the family seat, Cefntilla Court, to a nephew, Henry van Moyland of Los Angeles, not to the baron or his heirs.

References 

1927 births
2010 deaths
Barons in the Peerage of the United Kingdom
Eldest sons of British hereditary barons
FitzRoy Somerset, 5th Baron Raglan
Welsh Guards officers
Raglan